Alsophila incana, synonym Cyathea incana, is a species of tree fern.

It is native to Colombia, Ecuador, Peru, Bolivia, and northern Argentina.

Very little is known about this plant.

References

incana
Ferns of the Americas
Ferns of Argentina
Flora of Colombia
Flora of Bolivia
Ferns of Ecuador
Flora of Peru
Plants described in 1860